Młodzianów  is a village in the administrative district of Gmina Milicz, in Milicz County, Lower Silesian Voivodeship in southwestern Poland.

References

Villages in Milicz County